Vadim Boreț (born 5 September 1976) is a Moldovan professional football manager and former footballer.

Boreț started his career at Zimbru Chişinău before moved to Transnistria for FC Sheriff Tiraspol.

In January 2005, he moved to Polish side Dyskobolia on loan. He also on loan at FC Tiraspol in the second half of 2003–04 season. In summer 2005, he tried his luck to move to Neftchi Baku.

International career
He played 5 games for Moldova in 2006 FIFA World Cup qualifying. He was also a member of the team that participated in the 2002 FIFA World Cup qualifying and UEFA Euro 2004 qualifying campaigns.

He played his last match against Lithuania, on 16 August 2006, a friendly match, having made a total of 42 international appearances.

International goal
Scores and results list Moldova's goal tally first.

Honours 

FK Baku
Azerbaijan Cup: 2012

References

External links
Profile on FK Baku Official Site

FIFA.com
 Profile at Neftchi Baku

1976 births
Living people
Footballers from Chișinău
Moldovan footballers
Moldova international footballers
Association football midfielders
Moldovan Super Liga players
Azerbaijan Premier League players
FC Sheriff Tiraspol players
FC Tiraspol players
Dyskobolia Grodzisk Wielkopolski players
FC Baku players
FC Zimbru Chișinău players
Expatriate footballers in Poland
Expatriate footballers in Azerbaijan
Moldovan expatriate sportspeople in Azerbaijan
Moldovan expatriate sportspeople in Poland
Neftçi PFK players
Moldovan Super Liga managers
FC Sfîntul Gheorghe managers